The Southern Football League is an Australian rules football league based in Tasmania, Australia.

History

Beginning and growth
The Southern Tasmanian Football League (STFL) was founded in 1996. The league's original clubs were those of the recently defunct Tasmanian Amateur Football League (Southern Division) (Southern Amateurs) and two clubs from the Huon Football Association.

In the first season, the competing clubs from the Tasmanian Amateur Football League (Southern Division) were Mangalore (Brighton), Lauderdale, Lindisfarne, Claremont, Sorell and Lachlan, and those from the Huon Football Association were Kingston (Kingborough) and Channel.

Despite the lopsided results in many of the matches in its first two seasons, the STFL soon began to rival its long-established counterpart, the TFL Statewide League for attendances, community involvement, players, and money, as players and fans alike became tired of the politics and negativity that permeated the floundering TFL at that time.

With the demise of the 114-year-old Huon Football Association at the end of the 1997 season, and financially crippled former TFL club Hobart opting to pull out of the Statewide League at the end of the same season and voting to join the STFL, the league was ready for an influx of new teams as one of its foundation clubs, Lachlan, went out of business at the end of 1997.

Kermandie (then known as the Robins) and Cygnet (then known as the Magpies) were forced to change playing uniforms and emblems (to Bushrangers and The Port respectively) owing to clashes with already established clubs Brighton and Claremont.

Huonville Bulldogs merged with fellow Huon Football Association rival Franklin Lions to become the Huonville Lions and thus joined the STFL in 1998. Hobart (then known as the Tigers) were forced to change their emblem and playing strip owing to a clash with Kingston (Kingborough).

From 1998, the STFL became known as the Southern Football League. As the league continued to go from strength to strength, the TFL was sinking as crowds continued to slide and clubs sank further into the financial mire.

New Norfolk District Football Club, a member of the TFL since 1947, left the TFL at the end of 1999 and joined the SFL in 2000 as the New Norfolk 'Derwent' Hawks.

In early 1999 the Australian Football League funded a new governing body of Tasmanian football under recommendations through the AFL-instigated Biggs Report into the substantial crises facing Tasmanian football at that time, with the TFL being liquidated due to massive debts.

The new governing body was known as Football Tasmania and it was to control and fund the new TSFL competition and a year later, a new SWL competition.

In December 2000, the Burnie Dockers pulled out of the SWL to rejoin the NTFL, as did Devonport and Northern Bombers, leaving Football Tasmania little choice but to close down the Statewide competition as the AFL decided to redistribute its funding into placing a Tasmanian team in the Victorian Football League in 2001 which left Clarence, Glenorchy and North Hobart Football Clubs without a competition to participate in.

After numerous meetings and much debate it was decided to accept the three orphaned clubs into the league in early 2001 to create a 15-team competition for that season.

Premier League and Regional League split 
In 2002 the SFL split into two conferences – Premier League and Regional League.

The Premier League consisted of former TFL clubs Clarence, Glenorchy, North Hobart, Hobart and New Norfolk along with Kingston, Brighton and Sorell.

The Regional League consisted of Cygnet, Channel, Huonville Lions, Kermandie, Claremont, Lauderdale, Lindisfarne and former Tasman Football Association club Dodges Ferry, admitted into the league after the TFA folded at the end of the 2001 season.

In early 2003 the Sorell Football Club was forced to leave the Premier League after the club was unable to find enough volunteers to run the club and therefore went into recess for that season, its Premier League position was taken over by Lauderdale the following year.

Two new additions to the SFL Regional League in 2006 saw former Oatlands District Football Association clubs Oatlands, Kempton and Bothwell merge to create the Central Hawks while east coast club Triabunna (also from the ODFA) also were included.

Six clubs leave the SFL to join the State League and OSFA 
In 2008 AFL Tasmania announced plans to reintroduce the Tasmanian State League starting in 2009.

Under the plan Clarence, Glenorchy, North Hobart, Hobart and Lauderdale Football Clubs from the Premier League were targeted to join.

After subsequent meetings it was put to a vote of each club's members who accordingly voted affirmatively to leave the SFL and join the State League subject to individual conditions being met. Kingborough Football Club also made a plea to join the TSL but was turned down by AFL Tasmania due to its poor facilities and poor standard home ground at Kingston Beach Oval.

In January 2009, the Channel Football Club was granted permission to join the Old Scholars Football Association. After struggling on and off the ground for several years the Saints feared that they would be no match for former Premier League clubs rejoining the same competition as them, and that the resulting beatings they would've suffered could well have spelled the end of the Channel Football Club's existence so therefore, made a submission to join the more social OSFA competition.

Demise of Kermandie
Only weeks prior to the start of the 2009 season, Kermandie Football Club announced that it would be going into recess for the immediate future due to a lack of players, and despite a fresh attempt at reviving the club over the summer period of 2009/10, it was revealed that the club was again suffering from a chronic shortage of players and that Kermandie's demise was imminent.

Despite a late attempt to discuss a possible merger with fellow Huon club Cygnet, who at the time were also suffering from player shortages, the Cygnet Football Club expressed their wishes to continue on in their own right and therefore the Kermandie Football Club was set to go out of existence in March 2010 after a history spanning 123-years.

However, a faction within the club led by senior coach Paul Allison (a one time Sydney Swans listed player) had signed up former Sydney Swan and Brisbane Bears forward Warwick Capper, only days later Mark 'Jacko' Jackson was also signed up to try to breathe life into the club, these signings did however create much controversy within the Kermandie/Geeveston region with many supporters feeling that it was turning the club into a circus rather than a serious football club.

SFL President Paul Harriss remained unconvinced and the League had already printed out the season's roster without Kermandie's involvement. A meeting on 17 March 2010 discussed terms on the future of Kermandie Football Club and their involvement with the SFL, with a vote of all club delegates set to decide their fate, however the Kermandie Football Club delegate had already been instructed to advise that the club would not be seeking a return to the SFL in 2010 and as a result, the club was wound up and went out of existence.

Triabunna becomes East Coast Bombers 
In 2011, the Triabunna Football Club became known as the East Coast Bombers in a deal with TSL club Lauderdale which will see them send players from their reserves list (the TSL Reserves competition was axed at the completion of the 2010 season) to play for the former Roos senior team, which had been struggling badly since it entered the SFL in 2006.

Central Hawks in recess 
In 2013 the Central Hawks were forced to go into recess because of a lack of player numbers. The Hawks first entered the SFL in 2006 as a combination of former ODFA clubs Oatlands, Bothwell and Kempton. But Bothwell has re-entered the ODFA for this year in its own right. It will be a ten team competition with a final five format.

Clubs

Current clubs

Former clubs 

Notes

Grand Finals

STFL/SFL Grand Finals (1996–2001; 2009–present)

SFL Premier League Grand Finals: 2002–08

SFL Regional League Grand Finals: 2002–08

Goalkicking

STFL/SFL Leading Goalkickers: 1996–2001 & 2009 – present
● 1996 – Brad Howarth (Channel) – 123 
● 1997 – Darren Kaye (Lindisfarne) – 101 
● 1998 – Michael Darcy (Cygnet) – 119 
● 1999 – Dale Hall (Hobart) – 98 
● 2000 – Michael McGregor (Kermandie) – 114 
● 2001 – Robbie Devine (North Hobart) – 109 
● 2009 – Adrian Burdon (New Norfolk) – 106 
● 2010 – Clint Curtain (Claremont) – 87 
● 2011 – Tim Lamprill (Kingborough) – 105 
● 2012 – Michael Thompson (New Norfolk) – 101 
● 2013 – Ben Halton (Cygnet) – 88 
● 2014 – Josh Hall (New Norfolk) – 112 
● 2015 – Sean Salter (Claremont) – 101 
● 2016 – Sean Salter (Claremont) – 90 
● 2017 – Michael Cassidy (Lindisfarne) – 72 
● 2018 – Michael Cassidy (Lindisfarne) – 77 
● 2019 – Marcus Parker (New Norfolk) – 85 
● 2020 – Josh Fox (Cygnet) – 61
● 2021 – Cambell Hooker (Dodges Ferry) – 81
● 2022 – Joshua Green (Lindisfarne) - 97

SFL Premier League Leading Goalkickers: 2002–2008
● 2002 – Robbie Devine (North Hobart) – 65 
● 2003 – Matthew Smith (New Norfolk) – 67 
● 2004 – Sean Salter (Glenorchy) – 71 
● 2005 – Sean Salter (New Norfolk) – 76 
● 2006 – Michael Darcy (Kingborough) – 94 
● 2007 – Mitchell Williamson (Clarence) – 58 
● 2008 – Robbie Devine (North Hobart) – 82

SFL Regional League Leading Goalkickers: 2002–2008
● 2002 – Daniel Walter (Cygnet) – 88 
● 2003 – Michael Darcy (Cygnet) – 122 
● 2004 – Michael Darcy (Cygnet) – 117 
● 2005 – Michael Darcy (Cygnet) – 108 
● 2006 – Sam Bowering (Sorell) – 86 
● 2007 – Michael Darcy (Cygnet) – 103 
● 2008 – Chris Joyce (Huonville Lions) – 136

Medal Winners

Horrie Gorringe Medal Winners
(Best Player in the SFL Premier League Grand Final 2002-2008) 
● 2002 – Nick Davey (Clarence) 
● 2003 – Robbie Devine (North Hobart) 
● 2004 – Tim Geappen (Clarence) 
● 2005 – Michael Thompson (New Norfolk) 
● 2006 – Jeremy Sharpen (Clarence) 
● 2007 – Brad Curran (Glenorchy) 
● 2008 – Damian McIver (Glenorchy)

Tony Martyn Medal Winners
(Best Player in the SFL Regional League Grand Final 2002-2008) 
● 2002 – Gordon Shaw (Cygnet) 
● 2003 – Heath Dillon (Cygnet) 
● 2004 – Grant Clark (Cygnet) 
● 2005 – David Reynolds (Kermandie) 
● 2006 – Jamie Curran (Dodges Ferry) 
● 2007 – Anthony Baker (Kermandie) 
● 2008 – Darren Garth (Huonville Lions)

Gorringe-Martyn Medal Winners
(Best Player in SFL Grand Final 2009–Present; Amalgamation of previous Gorringe and Martyn Medals) 
● 2009 – Sam Hall (New Norfolk) 
● 2010 – Matthew Smith (New Norfolk) 
● 2011 –  
● 2012 – Brad Carver (New Norfolk) 
● 2013 – Nathan Ross (New Norfolk) 
● 2014 – Nathan Ross (New Norfolk) 
● 2015 – Nathan Matthews (Claremont) 
● 2016 – Braden Barwick (Claremont) 
● 2017 – Jason Laycock (New Norfolk) 
● 2018 – Michael Cassidy (Lindisfarne) 
● 2019 – Brad Tennick (Lindisfarne) 
● 2020 – Rhys Ward (Huonville Lions)
● 2021 – Thor Boscott (Cygnet) 
● 2022 – Matthew Phillips (Lindisfarne)

Hodgman Medal Winners – STFL/SFL/SFL Regional League
● 1996 – Jason Gulliver (Claremont) 
● 1997 – Tim Blanden (Lindisfarne) 
● 1998 – Andrew Beveridge (Channel) 
● 1999 – Jason Philp (Huonville Lions) 
● 2000 – Brendan Browning (Brighton) 
● 2001 – Damien Dillon (Cygnet) - Awarded a William Leitch Medal (Retrospective) 
● 2002 – Brad Marsland (Lauderdale) 
● 2003 – Danny Noonan (Dodges Ferry) 
● 2004 – Jeremy Brereton (Cygnet) 
● 2005 – Craig McLeod (Dodges Ferry) & Michael Gowans (Channel) 
● 2006 – Nick Doyle (Huonville Lions) 
● 2007 – Andrew Nash (Kermandie) 
● 2008 – Jamie Curran (Dodges Ferry)

Horrie Gorringe Medal Winners – SFL Premier League
● 2002 – Matthew Jones (New Norfolk) - Awarded a William Leitch Medal (Retrospective) 
● 2003 – Brendon Bolton (North Hobart) - Awarded a William Leitch Medal (Retrospective)

William Leitch Medal Winners – SFL Premier League (2004–2008) & SFL (2009 – present)
● 2004 – Brock Ackerley (New Norfolk) & Roger Belcher (New Norfolk) 
● 2005 – David Newett (Glenorchy) 
● 2006 – Jesse Crouch (Glenorchy) 
● 2007 – Brad Carver (New Norfolk) 
● 2008 – Shane Piuselli (Glenorchy) 
● 2009 – Roger Belcher (New Norfolk) 
● 2010 – James Lange (Huonville Lions) 
● 2011 – Nathan Ross (New Norfolk) 
● 2012 – Michael Thompson (New Norfolk) 
● 2013 – Nathan Ross (New Norfolk) 
● 2014 – Caden Wilson (New Norfolk) 
● 2015 – Nathan Brown (Claremont) 
● 2016 – Troy Cunliffe (Lindisfarne) 
● 2017 – Troy Cunliffe (Lindisfarne) 
● 2018 – Jarrod Lawler (Huonville Lions) 
● 2019 – Mitchell Walker (Claremont) 
● 2020 – Ethan Brock (Huonville Lions)
● 2021 – Thor Boscott (Cygnet)

SFL Records

SFL Record Highest Scores
● 396 – Channel 60.36 (396) d Lachlan 1.0 (6) – Snug Park (29 July 1996) 
● 362 – Huonville Lions 57.20 (362) d Triabunna 0.3 (3) – Huonville (24 July 2010) 
● 341 – Huonville Lions 52.29 (341) d Claremont 0.0 (0) – Huonville (31 July 2021)
● 329 – Cygnet 52.17 (329) d Claremont 0.0 (0) – Abbotsfield Park (29 May 2021) 
● 311 – Channel 48.23 (311) d Sorell 4.5 (29) – Snug Park (15 June 1996) 
● 311 – Huonville Lions 47.29 (311) d Triabunna 4.4 (28) – Huonville (30 June 2007) 
● 303 – Cygnet 46.27 (303) d Claremont 0.0 (0) – Cygnet (14 August 2021)
● 293 – Brighton 45.23 (293) d Sorell 4.3 (27) – Pontville (29 March 1996) 
● 289 – Brighton 43.31 (289) d Claremont 1.0 (6) – Pontville (7 August 2021)
● 277 – Lindisfarne 42.25 (277) d Channel 2.7 (19) – Anzac Park (12 July 2008)
● 276 – Claremont 43.18 (276) d Huonville Lions 2.1 (13) – Abbotsfield Park (2 August 2014) 
● 276 – New Norfolk 40.36 (276) d Triabunna 4.5 (29) – Triabunna (5 June 2010)
● 270 – Kermandie 42.18 (270) d Triabunna 7.4 (46) – Kermandie (16 June 2007)
● 269 – Clarence 41.23 (269) d Brighton 5.4 (34) – Blundstone Arena (7 May 2005)
● 265 – Kingborough 41.19 (265) d Lachlan 5.7 (37) – Kingston Beach Oval (24 August 1996)
● 264 – New Norfolk 40.24 (264) d Hobart 3.5 (23) – TCA Ground (2 August 2014)
● 264 – New Norfolk 40.24 (264) d Triabunna 2.2 (14) – Boyer Oval (1 August 2009)

SFL Record Lowest Scores
● 0 – Claremont 0.0 (0) v Cygnet 46.27 (303) – Cygnet (14 August 2021)
● 0 – Claremont 0.0 (0) v Cygnet 52.17 (329) – Abbotsfield Park (29 May 2021) 
● 0 – Claremont 0.0 (0) v Huonville Lions 52.29 (341) – Huonville (31 July 2021)
● 1 – Claremont 0.1 (1) v New Norfolk 39.27 (261) – Boyer Oval (2 April 2021) 
● 2 – Claremont 0.2 (2) v Sorell 24.30 (174)  – Abbotsfield Park (3 July 2021) 
 
● 3 – Brighton 0.3 (3) v North Hobart 19.22 (136) – Pontville (19 June 2004) 
● 3 – Triabunna 0.3 (3) v Huonville Lions 57.20 (362) – Huonville (24 July 2010) 
● 3 – Claremont 0.3 (3) v Huonville Lions 34.36 (240) – Abbotsfield Park (24 April 2021) 
● 4 – Claremont 0.4 (4) v Lindisfarne 38.25 (253) – Abbotsfield Park (17 July 2021)
● 4 – Sorell 0.4 (4) v Cygnet 17.22 (124) - Pembroke Park (26 June 2021)
● 4 – Triabunna 0.4 (4) v Cygnet 29.22 (196) – Cygnet (7 August 2010) 
● 5 – Channel 0.5 (5) v Brighton 22.17 (149) – Pontville (1 July 2000) 
● 6 – Claremont 1.0 (6) v Brighton 43.31 (289) – Pontville (7 August 2021) 
● 6 – Lachlan 1.0 (6) v Channel 60.36 (396) – Snug Park (29 July 1996) 
● 6 – Hobart 1.0 (6) v Claremont 38.27 (255) – TCA Ground (12 July 2014)

SFL Record Highest Margin
● 390 – Channel 60.36 (396) d Lachlan 1.0 (6) – Snug Park (29 July 1996) 
● 359 – Huonville Lions 57.20 (362) d Triabunna 0.3 (3) – Huonville (24 July 2010)
● 341 – Huonville Lions 52.29 (341) d Claremont 0.0 (0) – Huonville (31 July 2021)
● 329 – Cygnet 52.17 (329) d Claremont 0.0 (0) – Abbotsfield Park (29 May 2021) 
● 303 – Cygnet 46.27 (303) d Claremont 0.0 (0) – Cygnet (14 August 2021)
● 283 – Brighton 43.31 (289) d Claremont 1.0 (6) – Pontville (7 August 2021)
● 283 – Huonville Lions 47.29 (311) d Triabunna 4.4 (28) – Huonville (30 June 2007) 
● 282 – Channel 48.23 (311) d Sorell 4.5 (29) – Snug Park (15 June 1996) 
● 266 – Brighton 45.23 (293) d Sorell 4.3 (27) – Pontville (29 March 1996) 
● 263 – Claremont 43.18 (276) d Huonville Lions 2.1 (13) – Abbotsfield Park (2 August 2014)
● 260 – New Norfolk 39.27 (261) d Claremont 0.1 (1) – Boyer Oval (2 April 2021)
● 258 – Lindisfarne 42.25 (277) d Channel 2.7 (19) – Anzac Park (12 July 2008)
● 255 – Dodges Ferry 40.22 (262) d Claremont 1.1 (7) – Shark Park (24 July 2021)
● 250 – Brighton 39.23 (257) d Triabunna 1.1 (7) – Pontville (22 May 2010)
● 250 – New Norfolk 40.24 (264) d Triabunna 2.2 (14) – Boyer Oval (1 August 2009)
● 249 – Lindisfarne 38.25 (253) d Claremont 0.4 (4) – Abbotsfield Park (17 July 2021)
● 249 – Claremont 38.27 (255) d Hobart 1.0 (6) – TCA Ground (12 July 2014)

SFL Record Highest Match Aggregate
● 402 – Channel 60.36 (396) d Lachlan 1.0 (6) – Snug Park (29 July 1996) 
● 365 – Huonville Lions 57.20 (362) d Triabunna 0.3 (3) – Huonville (24 July 2010) 
● 341 – Huonville Lions 52.29 (341) d Claremont 0.0 (0) – Huonville (31 July 2021)
● 340 – Channel 48.23 (311) d Sorell 4.5 (29) – Snug Park (15 June 1996) 
● 339 – Huonville Lions 47.29 (311) d Triabunna 4.4 (28) – Huonville (30 June 2007) 
● 330 – New Norfolk 33.21 (219) d Lindisfarne 17.9 (111) – Anzac Park (10 April 2010) 
● 329 – Cygnet 52.17 (329) d Claremont 0.0 (0) – Abbotsfield Park (29 May 2021) 
● 326 – Lindisfarne 39.9 (243) d Channel 13.5 (83) – Anzac Park (14 April 2007)
● 320 – Brighton 45.23 (293) d Sorell 4.3 (27) – Pontville (29 March 1996) 
● 316 – Kermandie 42.18 (270) d Triabunna 7.4 (46) – Kermandie (16 June 2007)
● 308 – New Norfolk 32.25 (217) d Kingborough 14.7 (91) – Kingston Beach Oval (18 April 2009)
● 305 – New Norfolk 40.25 (265) d Brighton 6.4 (40) – Boyer Oval (25 April 2009)
● 305 – New Norfolk 40.36 (276) d Triabunna 4.5 (29) – Triabunna (5 June 2010)
● 303 – Cygnet 46.27 (303) d Claremont 0.0 (0) – Cygnet (14 August 2021)
● 303 – Clarence 41.23 (269) d Brighton 5.4 (34) – Blundstone Arena (7 May 2005)
● 302 – Lindisfarne 34.15 (219) d Lachlan 13.5 (83) – Anzac Park (29 June 1996)
● 302 – Kingborough 41.19 (265) d Lachlan 5.7 (37) – Kingston Beach Oval (24 August 1996)

SFL Record – Most Behinds (Match)
● 36 – Channel 60.36 (396) d Lachlan 1.0 (6) – Snug Park (29 July 1996) 
● 36 – New Norfolk 40.36 (276) d Triabunna 4.5 (29) – Triabunna (24 July 2010) 
● 36 – Huonville Lions 34.36 (240) d Claremont 0.3 (3) – Abbotsfield Park (24 April 2021) 
● 35 – Brighton 23.35 (173) d Lindisfarne 6.3 (39) – Pontville (4 July 1998) 
● 35 – Dodges Ferry 23.35 (173) d Triabunna 4.4 (28) – Port Arthur (19 June 2010) 
● 33 – Claremont 14.33 (117) d Triabunna 4.7 (31) – Triabunna (12 April 2008)
● 33 – Lindisfarne 38.33 (261) d Channel 3.6 (24) – Snug Park (3 May 2008)
● 32 – Claremont 35.32 (242) d Huonville Lions 5.3 (33) – Huonville (14 June 2014) 
● 32 – Kingborough 36.32 (248) d Triabunna 5.4 (34) – Kingston Beach Oval (10 April 2010)
● 31 – Brighton 43.31 (289) d Claremont 1.0 (6) – Pontville (7 August 2021)
● 31 – Hobart 21.31 (157) d Lindisfarne 6.7 (43) – TCA Ground (9 May 1998) 
● 31 – Lauderdale 14.31 (115) d Lindisfarne 10.6 (66) – Anzac Park (3 April 1999) 
● 31 – Huonville Lions 33.31 (229) d Triabunna 3.6 (24) – Triabunna (1 May 2010) 
● 31 – Dodges Ferry 8.31 (79) dw Brighton 12.7 (79) – Shark Park (26 May 2012) 
● 31 – Dodges Ferry 26.31 (187) d Brighton 5.5 (35) – Shark Park (21 April 2018)

SFL Record – Highest Score (Quarter)
● 117 – Channel 18.9 (117) v Lachlan (4th Qtr) – Snug Park (29 July 1996) 
● 105 – Channel 16.9 (105) v Lachlan (3rd Qtr) – Snug Park (29 July 1996) 
● 100 – Channel 15.10 (100) v Lachlan (1st Qtr) – Snug Park (29 July 1996) 
● 98 – Huonville Lions 16.2 (98) v Triabunna (3rd Qtr) – Huonville (24 July 2010) 
● 96 – Cygnet 15.6 (96) v Claremont (3rd Qtr) – Cygnet (14 August 2021)
● 96 – Kingston 15.6 (96) v Lachlan  (1st Qtr) – Kingston Beach (6 July 1996)  
● 96 – New Norfolk 15.6 (96) v Sorell (4th Qtr) – Boyer Oval (9 June 2012) 
● 96 – Huonville Lions 15.6 (96) v Triabunna (4th Qtr) – Huonville (24 July 2010) 
● 94 – Cygnet 15.4 (94) v Claremont (4th Qtr) – Abbotsfield Park (29 May 2021)
● 92 – Huonville Lions 14.8 (92) v Claremont (2nd Qtr) – Huonville (31 July 2021)
● 91 – Huonville Lions 14.7 (91) v Claremont (4th Qtr) – Huonville (31 July 2021)
● 91 – Lindisfarne 14.7 (91) v Claremont (2nd Qtr) – Abbotsfield Park (17 July 2021)
● 90 – Dodges Ferry 14.6 (90) v Claremont (3rd Qtr) – Abbotsfield Park (8 May 2021)
● 90 – Brighton 14.6 (90) v Sorell (4th Qtr) – Pontville (29 March 1996) 
● 90 – Kingborough 14.6 (90) v Lachlan (4th Qtr) – Kensington Park (11 May 1996) 
● 90 – Huonville Lions 14.6 (90) v Triabunna (1st Qtr) – Huonville (24 July 2010)

SFL Record Most Goals Kicked In A Match (Individual)
● 18 – Brad Howarth (Channel) v Sorell – Snug Park (15 June 1996) 
● 18 – Brendan Fevola (New Norfolk) v Huonville Lions – Boyer Oval (16 June 2012)
● 16 – Michael Cassidy (Lindisfarne) v Claremont – Abbotsfield Park (17 July 2021) 
● 16 – Brendan Fevola (New Norfolk) v Brighton – Boyer Oval (29 June 2013) 
● 15 – Byron Howard Jr (Brighton) v Lindisfarne – Anzac Park (17 April 1999) 
● 15 – Michael McGregor (Kermandie) v Lindisfarne – Kermandie (3 June 2000) 
● 15 – Robbie Devine (North Hobart) v Lindisfarne – Anzac Park (11 August 2001) 
● 15 – Michael Darcy (Cygnet) v Channel – Cygnet (2 June 2007)
● 14 – Brock Daniels (Hobart) v Claremont – TCA Ground (26 June 2021)
● 14 – Marcus Parker (New Norfolk) v Sorell – Pembroke Park (6 July 2019)
● 14 – Chris Joyce (Huonville Lions) v Triabunna – Huonville (30 June 2007)
● 13 – Josh Green (Lindisfarne) v New Norfolk – Anzac Park (4 June 2022)
● 12 – Josh Fox (Cygnet) v Claremont – Cygnet (8 August 2020)

SFL Record All-Time Leading Goalkicker (Individual)
● 983 – Michael Darcy (Cygnet & Kingborough) - 1998-2017

Ladders

2010 
																	
																	
FINALS

2011 
																	
																	
FINALS

2012 
																	
																	
FINALS

2013 
																	
																	
FINALS

2014 
																	
																	
FINALS

See also
 Tasmanian Football League
 Northern Tasmanian Football League

Notes

External links
 Official website

 
Australian rules football competitions in Tasmania